The 2019–20 Bristol City W.F.C. season was the club's fourth season under the Bristol City affiliation and the organisation's 21st overall season in existence. It was their third consecutive full season in the FA Women's Super League following promotion to the 2017 Spring Season. Along with competing in the WSL, the club also competed in two domestic cup competitions: the FA Cup and the League Cup.

On 13 March 2020, in line with the FA's response to the coronavirus pandemic, it was announced the season was temporarily suspended until at least 3 April 2020. After further postponements, the season was ultimately ended prematurely on 25 May 2020 with immediate effect. Bristol City sat in 10th at the time and retained their position on sporting merit after The FA Board's decision to award places on a points-per-game basis.

Squad

FA Women's Super League

Results summary

Results by matchday

Results

League table

Women's FA Cup 

As a member of the top two tiers, Bristol City entered the FA Cup in the fourth round, beating Championship side Durham in extra-time to progress to the next round. They were drawn against fellow WSL side Everton in the fifth round with the game moved to Ashton Gate, the second match of the season to be moved to the men's stadium after the season opener.

FA Women's League Cup

Group stage

Squad statistics

Appearances 

Starting appearances are listed first, followed by substitute appearances after the + symbol where applicable.

|-
|colspan="14"|Players away from the club on loan:

|-
|colspan="14"|Players who appeared for Bristol City but left during the season:

|}

Goalscorers

Transfers

Transfers in

Loans in

Transfers out

Loans out

References 

Bristol City